Timothy Mark Kubinski (born January 20, 1972) is a former American professional baseball pitcher. He played parts of two seasons in Major League Baseball, 1997 and 1999, for the Oakland Athletics.

Career
Kubinski attended UCLA, and in 1992 he played collegiate summer baseball with the Cotuit Kettleers of the Cape Cod Baseball League where he was named a league all-star. He was selected by Oakland in the 7th round of the 1993 MLB Draft.

References

External links

1972 births
Living people
American expatriate baseball players in Canada
Arizona League Athletics players
Baseball players from Washington (state)
Chico Heat players
Cotuit Kettleers players
Edmonton Trappers players
Huntsville Stars players
Major League Baseball pitchers
Modesto A's players
Newark Bears players
Oakland Athletics players
People from Pullman, Washington
Sacramento River Cats players
Southern Oregon A's players
Vancouver Canadians players
West Michigan Whitecaps players